Transcription Broadcast Systems, also known as Green Schneider RKO, was founded in New York City, New York, in 1939 by Raymond Green and Henry Schneider.

History
Transcription Broadcast Systems broadcasts several popular radio shows in major American cities including Chicago, Miami, Houston, Los Angeles and New York. 

By 1942, the network had been broadcast in 17 countries and four languages. 

In 1946, Green wrote a show called Home With Daddie which turned into My Favorite Husband after his death in 1949. Within a year of Green's death, the company had perished.

Defunct radio broadcasting companies of the United States
Mass media companies established in 1939
1939 establishments in New York City
Mass media companies disestablished in 1950